Jerome "Rome" Fortune (born October 13, 1988) is an American rapper. who rose to prominence after the release of his Beautiful Pimp mixtape in 2013. Influenced by a diverse range of musical traditions, Fortune has released 6 EPs and has collaborated with a number of artists from the Atlanta hip hop scene, including OG Maco, Dun Deal, and ILoveMakonnen.

Life and career 
Born in Philadelphia, Pennsylvania, Fortune comes from a family of musicians and is related to cornetist Nat Adderley and saxophonist Cannonball Adderley. He began rapping in high school and claims that he shortened his name because his birth name, "Jerome," reminded him of an aging pimp character from Martin Lawrence's Martin TV series. Fortune considers his grandfather, jazz musician Richard Adderley, to be one of the most influential figures in his life. Adderley co-produced and played the vibraphone on Fortune's Beautiful Pimp II EP and is featured in the music video for the track "OneDay".

Pitchfork named Beautiful Pimp one of their "Overlooked Mixtapes of 2013." In the summer of 2014, Fortune joined British indie-rock group Glass Animals for their U.S. and U.K. tours.

In January 2015, Fortune announced via Twitter that he was turning himself into police custody for unknown reasons. Fortune was booked into the Cobb County Jail in Marietta, Georgia on January 16, 2015 and announced his release on February 6, 2015. Fortune joined IAMSU's "Eyes on Me" North American tour in March 2015.

Though Fortune's early EP The Air Mattress (2011) was released on Wil May's Makeshift label, he was unsigned until late 2015, when he was backed by Fool's Gold Records. Fortune released his debut album, Jerome Raheem Fortune, in 2016.

Artistry

Influences 
Fortune has stated that he is influenced by 90s rap, particularly DMX, whose Flesh of My Flesh, Blood of My Blood he cites as the "rap album that changed [his] life". Fortune also draws inspiration from jazz, considering it "pretty much parallel to hip-hop."

Musical style 
Fortune's style frequently combines regional hip hop traditions, such as the blending of ratchet and trap music elements on Beautiful Pimp. He entered the world of electronic music for his Small VVorld EP, which features a number of tracks produced by U.K. electronic artist Four Tet.

Discography

Albums 
Jerome Raheem Fortune (2016)
FREEk (2020)

EPs 
 The Air Mattress (2011)
 V O Y E U R (with Childish Major) (2012)
 Beautiful Pimp II (2014)
 Drive, Thighs, & Lies (with Dun Deal) (2014)
 YEP (with OG Maco) (2015)
Toro Y Rome Vol.1 (with Toro y Moi) (2018)

Mixtapes 
 lolo (with CeeJ) (2012)
 Beautiful Pimp (2013)
 Small VVorld (2014)
 loloU (with CeeJ) (2015)
 VVORLDVVIDE PIMPSATION (2016)

Collaborations 
 Stripes (with Gucci Mane & Bankroll Fresh) 2014
Hazey (with Glass Animals)  (2014)
Drop That Ass On The Ground Like Some Change (with Ethereal & Relly Jade)
Rollin' (with Brenmar & Lil Uzi Vert) (2014)
Lights Low (with Four Tet) (2014)
Men of Glass (with Sevdaliza) (2015)
 No Ma'am (with IloveMakonnen & Rich the Kid) (2016) 
Buried (with What So Not) (2016)
 Leave It (with ƱZ) (2018)

References 

People from Atlanta
1988 births
Living people
American hip hop musicians
Rappers from Atlanta
Musicians from Atlanta
Rappers from Georgia (U.S. state)
African-American male rappers
Southern hip hop musicians
21st-century American rappers
21st-century American male musicians
21st-century African-American musicians
20th-century African-American people